The 2014 Pro12 Grand Final was the final match of the 2013–14 Pro12 season. The 2013–14 season was the third with RaboDirect as title sponsor and the fifth ever League Grand Final. The final was between defending champions Leinster and the Glasgow Warriors.
Leinster won the game 34–12.	
		
A hamstring injury forced Brian O'Driscoll off after eight minutes in his 186th and final appearance for Leinster before retiring from rugby.

Route to the final

2014 Playoffs
The semi-finals followed a 1 v 4, 2 v 3 system with the games being played at the home ground of the higher placed teams.

Build-Up 
Leinster were favorites to win the game at 4/11 odds with Glasgow at 2/1 at Paddy Power. Glasgow had only won once in 19 games against Leinster.

Leinster were appearing in a fifth successive final while this is a first final for Glasgow. Brian O'Driscoll was making his final appearance as a professional rugby player in this game.	
	
The match was shown live on RTÉ Two and TG4 in Ireland, and live on BBC Alba and BBC Scotland in the UK.

Match

Details

References

External links
Coverage at ESPN

2014
2013–14 Pro12
2013–14 in Irish rugby union
2013–14 in Scottish rugby union
Glasgow Warriors matches
Leinster Rugby matches